The  Hotel Saskatchewan is a historic hotel, one of Canada's grand railway hotels located in downtown Regina, Saskatchewan, Canada, overlooking Victoria Park.

The Hotel Saskatchewan was the fourteenth hotel in a nationwide chain constructed and owned by the Canadian Pacific Railway. The railway's earlier hotels, such as the Château Frontenac in Quebec City, the Chateau Lake Louise and the Banff Springs Hotel were designed in a distinctive château style, but by the late 1920s this had been abandoned in favor of a much simpler and less expensive style although the Canadian National Railway's Bessborough hotel in Saskatoon was built from 1928 to 1932. The Hotel Saskatchewan was the hub of the city's social life, and today operates as part of the Marriott International chain.

History

A prior attempt at construction of a grand railway hotel for Regina, the Chateau Qu'Appelle, failed when the Grand Trunk Pacific Railway went bankrupt. The partially constructed Chateau Qu'Appelle—now the site of the Royal Saskatchewan Museum on the corner of Albert Street and College Avenue—remained derelict for some years until Canadian Pacific purchased the disused girders for use in the construction of the Hotel Saskatchewan and the large excavation was finally filled.

The foundations remained in the ground, however, substantially accounting for the positioning of the Provincial Museum (now the Royal Saskatchewan Museum) at the corner of College Avenue and Albert Street but diagonally and substantially back from the streets. It is of course uncertain that if the Chateau Qu'Appelle had successfully been completed it would remain standing, but comparable palatial railway hotels in Quebec City, Montreal, Toronto, Saskatoon, Banff Springs, Vancouver, Victoria, BC and elsewhere remain standing and thriving.

The hotel's opening in 1927 meant that Government House was no longer needed to accommodate official guests as it had previously done for visitors such as the future King George V and Queen Mary, who visited the then-Territories in 1901 as Duke and Duchess of Cornwall and York; Prince Arthur, Duke of Connaught, his wife and their daughter Princess Patricia in 1912, the Prince of Wales in 1927.

On February 19, 2014, Winnipeg-based Temple Hotels, owners of Moose Jaw's Temple Gardens, Saskatoon Inn and Regina's Wingate hotel, announced it would purchase Hotel Saskatchewan for $32.8 million and would undertake a three-year $6 million improvement campaign.

In July 2015, Toronto real estate investment firm InnVest REIT announced a deal to purchase the hotel for $37 million. As part of the sale, the hotel switched its affiliation from Radisson to Marriott Autograph Collection.

References

External links
 

Hotel buildings completed in 1927
Hotels in Saskatchewan
Buildings and structures in Regina, Saskatchewan
Ross and Macdonald buildings
Autograph Collection Hotels